Roderick F. Gardner (born October 26, 1977) is a former American college and professional football player who was a wide receiver in the National Football League (NFL) for six seasons.

College career
Gardner played college football at Clemson University, where he started as a quarterback and safety on the practice squad (as a true freshman) before switching to wide receiver his sophomore year. He was selected as a second team All-ACC during his junior year after setting the school record for catches, yards, and receptions per game. His senior year, he not only made first team All-ACC, but was a first team All-American as well. In 2000, he was one of the ten finalists for the Biletnikoff Award after posting six touchdowns on 51 receptions and 956 yards.

Professional career

Washington Redskins
Gardner was chosen by the Washington Redskins with the 15th overall selection in the first-round draft pick of the 2001 NFL Draft. During his rookie year, he was selected as NFC Offensive Player of the Week after a 208-yard, one touchdown performance against the Carolina Panthers. His history at quarterback would lead the Redskins to utilize him on trick plays during games; during the 2003 NFL season he was 2-for-3 for 46 yards and two passing touchdowns (to Chad Morton and Trung Canidate).

Carolina Panthers
After four seasons in Washington, he was traded to the Carolina Panthers during the 2005 offseason for a sixth-round pick in the 2006 NFL Draft.  He spent most of the season fourth on the Panthers' depth chart, behind Steve Smith, Keary Colbert, and Ricky Proehl.

Green Bay Packers
Gardner was waived by the Panthers on December 16, 2005, and he was then signed by the Green Bay Packers on December 19, 2005.  He re-signed with Green Bay on March 21, 2006. On September 2, 2006, Gardner was waived by the Packers.

Kansas City Chiefs
In September 2006 he signed a three-year contract with the Kansas City Chiefs. In 2006 with the Chiefs, he only had 2 receptions for 17 yards. He was released before the 2007 season.

NFL statistics

References

1977 births
Living people
Players of American football from Jacksonville, Florida
William M. Raines High School alumni
American football wide receivers
Clemson Tigers football players
Clemson University alumni
Washington Redskins players
Carolina Panthers players
Green Bay Packers players
Kansas City Chiefs players